Enatel is an electronics company based in Christchurch, New Zealand. Established in 2002, the company designs and manufactures standby power supplies for telecommunications companies. It also produces industrial and commercial battery chargers for electric vehicles, particularly forklifts.  Enatel is an example of a New Zealand manufacturer filling a "global niche", according to the country's Ministry of Business, Innovation and Employment.

References

External links 

Manufacturing companies of New Zealand
Electronics companies established in 2002
Companies based in Christchurch
2002 establishments in New Zealand